Horacio Tomás Liendo (17 December 1924 - 27 August 2007) was an Argentinian military officer, who served in various positions during the National Reorganization Process such as Minister of Labour between 1976 and 1979, and also Minister of Interior in 1981. Moreover, he was in charge of the presidency of Argentina during 21 days in 1981.

He was born in Cordoba and was formed as Army officer at the Colegio Militar de la Nación. When President Roberto Eduardo Viola was suffering a heart ailment in 1981, he became acting president. He died in Buenos Aires at age of 82.

References 

1924 births
2007 deaths